Thomas Downing (21 January 1883 – 18 October 1943) was an Irish middle-distance runner. He competed in the men's 3200 metres steeplechase at the 1908 Summer Olympics, representing Great Britain.

References

External links
 

1883 births
1943 deaths
Athletes (track and field) at the 1908 Summer Olympics
Irish male middle-distance runners
Irish male steeplechase runners
Olympic athletes of Great Britain
Place of birth missing